Khusheh Darreh (also Romanized as Khūsheh Darreh) is a village in Saheb Rural District, Ziviyeh District, Saqqez County, Kurdistan Province, Iran. Karim mostafavi is in charge of oil distribution. At the 2006 census, its population was 235, in 54 families. The village is populated by Kurds.

References 

Towns and villages in Saqqez County
Kurdish settlements in Kurdistan Province